Dmitry Filippov (born 19 May 1969 in Krasnodar) is a Russian handball player.

He played for the Russia men's national handball team at the 2000 Summer Olympics in Sydney, where Russia won the gold medal.

References

1969 births
Living people
Russian male handball players
Olympic handball players of Russia
Handball players at the 1996 Summer Olympics
Handball players at the 2000 Summer Olympics
Olympic gold medalists for Russia
Sportspeople from Krasnodar
Olympic medalists in handball
Medalists at the 2000 Summer Olympics